Delonix is a genus of flowering plants in the family Fabaceae, subfamily Caesalpinioideae.  It contains trees that are native to Madagascar and East Africa. By far the best known species is the Royal Poinciana (D. regia).

The name of the genus is derived from the Greek words δηλος (delos), meaning "evident," and ονυξ (onyx), meaning "claw," referring to the petals. The common name, poinciana, comes from a former genus of the same name in which the members of the current genus Delonix were classified along with plants now placed in the genus Caesalpinia.

Selected species

References

External links

 
Fabaceae genera
Taxa named by Constantine Samuel Rafinesque